Arbeiterwille was social democratic paper published in Graz, Styria, Austria, from 1890 to 1934.

Arbeiterwille first appeared on 9 July 1890 and continued to be published until 12 February 1934 when the defeat of the Schutzbund in the Austrian Civil War led to its suppression.

Academic studies 
(in German)
 Friedrich Kleinschuster: Der „Arbeiterwille“ von 1907 bis 1914. Die Geschichte der steirischen Sozialdemokratie und ihres Zentralorgans von den ersten allgemeinen Reichsratswahlen 1907 bis zum Ausbruch des 1. Weltkrieges. Graz 1978 (Graz, University, unprinted philosophical dissertation, 19 July 1978)
 Friedrich Kleinschuster: Zur Geschichte der steirischen Arbeiterpresse. Der „Arbeiterwille“ von den Anfängen bis zum Ersten Weltkrieg. In: Robert Hinteregger, Karl Müller, Eduard Staudinger (eds.): Auf dem Weg in die Freiheit. Anstöße zu einer steirischen Zeitgeschichte. Kuratorium der Wanderausstellung „Für Freiheit, Arbeit und Recht“, Graz 1984, pp. 131–162
 Helmut W. Lang (ed.): Österreichische Retrospektive Bibliographie (ORBI). Reihe 2: Österreichische Zeitungen 1492–1945. Band 2: Helmut W. Lang, Ladislaus Lang, Wilma Buchinger: Bibliographie der österreichischen Zeitungen 1621–1945. A–M. Bearbeitet an der Österreichischen Nationalbibliothek. K. G. Saur, München 2003, pp. 111–112

German-language newspapers published in Austria
Socialist newspapers
Social Democratic Party of Austria
Mass media in Graz
Newspapers established in 1890
Publications disestablished in 1934
Defunct newspapers published in Austria